Sh2-113 (Sharpless 113) also known as the flying dragon nebula or LBN 333, is a small planetary nebula that resembles a supernova remnant (SNR) but with no evidence to support it being an SNR. Sh2-113 is located in the northern hemisphere constellation of Cygnus south of the star Deneb. Nearby are other planetary nebulas named K 2-81, Sh2-114, Kn 26 and LBN 346.

References 

Planetary nebulae
Cygnus (constellation)
113